Monster Shark is a science fiction-horror film directed by Lamberto Bava. It was also released in various countries as Devil Fish, Monster from the Red Ocean, Devouring Waves and Shark: Red in the Ocean. The script was co-written by Dardano Sacchetti, based on a story idea contributed by Luigi Cozzi and producer Sergio Martino. released in Italy from September 7, 1984, later in United States as Devil Fish in November 14, 1986, this was the final film distributed by Cinema Shares International Distribution.

Plot 
The film takes place along a stretch of coastline somewhere in Florida, where a local tourist spot has become plagued by a mysterious marine creature. Unbeknownst to them, the monster is the product of a secret military experiment; it is a genetic hybrid mutated from a common octopus and the prehistoric Dunkleosteus. Unfortunately, the creature has broken loose and is now feeding on swimmers and tourists swimming or sailing along the coast. As the monster is only an infant, it will continue to grow if it is left to hunt much longer.

A team of scientists led by a scientist named Peter and his colleague, Dr. Stella Dickens, are trying to find the creature and stop it; meanwhile, a group of military scientists are trying to stop the scientists, as the experiment was classified military business. The creature slowly picks off both groups while they try to track it down. They eventually find it hiding in the Everglades, corner it in shallow waters, and kill it with repeated blasts from flamethrowers.

Cast 
 Michael Sopkiw as Peter
 Valentine Monnier as Dr. Stella Dickens 
 Gianni Garko as Sheriff Gordon
 William Berger as Professor Donald West 
 Iris Peynado as Sandra Hayes
 Dino Conti as Dr. Bob Hogan
 Cinzia de Ponti as Florinda
 Paul Branco as Dr. Davis Barker 
 Dagmar Lassander as Sonja West

Reception 
TV Guide called it "wholly amateurish" and criticized the film's unconvincing monster. Star Michael Sopkiw attributes the film's flaws and negative reviews to the production's limited budget, saying that Lamberto Bava was a great director.

Mystery Science Theater 3000 
On August 15, 1998, Monster Shark, under its alternative title of Devil Fish, was featured on an episode of the movie-mocking television series Mystery Science Theater 3000, on which it was spoofed for its poor acting and erratic editing. One scene of this film contains a brief glimpse of a male character's genitals, the show censored by superimposing the MST3K logo, and two key death scenes were removed.

See also 
Sharktopus

Footnotes

References

External links 
 
 
 

1984 films
1984 horror films
English-language French films
English-language Italian films
1980s Italian-language films
Films about cephalopods
1980s science fiction horror films
1980s multilingual films
Films about sharks
Italian science fiction horror films
Italian multilingual films
Films about shark attacks
Giant monster films
Natural horror films
French multilingual films
French science fiction horror films
Films directed by Lamberto Bava
Films set in the United States
Films scored by Guido & Maurizio De Angelis
Films scored by Fabio Frizzi
1980s Italian films
1980s French films